World Tour E.P. is an EP that was released in 1997 by Echo & the Bunnymen. The EP was released on CD by PolyGram in Japan. In 1998 it was released by London Records in Australia.

The EP contains two songs from the band's 1997 album, Evergreen, "Evergreen" and "Don't Let It Get You Down"; two songs from the band's 1997 appearance at the Glastonbury Festival, "Rescue" and "Altamont"; and "Forgiven", a track recorded for the Robert Elms Show on Greater London Radio.

Track listings
All tracks written by Will Sergeant, Ian McCulloch and Les Pattinson except where noted.

"Evergreen" – 3:22
"Don't Let It Get You Down" – 4:38
"Rescue" (live) (Sergeant, McCulloch, Pattinson, Pete de Freitas) – 3:39
"Altamont" (live) – 2:42
"Forgiven" (live acoustic) – 3:01

References

1997 EPs
Echo & the Bunnymen EPs